Champs 12 is an Argentine teen soap opera, starred by Liz Solari and Tomás de las Heras, and broadcast by América TV. It began broadcasting on March 16, 2009 and ending September 8, 2010.

At first, the comedy was scheduled at 8 p.m., and then it was moved to 11:15 p.m. On July 6, it was rescheduled again and moved to 9:15 p.m.

Argentine telenovelas
2009 telenovelas
2009 Argentine television series debuts
2010 Argentine television series endings
América TV original programming
Spanish-language telenovelas